{{Infobox election
| election_name = 2018 United States Senate election in California
| country = California
| type = presidential
| ongoing = no
| previous_election = 2012 United States Senate election in California
| previous_year = 2012
| next_election = 2024 United States Senate election in California
| next_year = 2024
| election_date = November 6, 2018
| turnout = 56.42%
| image1 = 
| candidate1 = Dianne Feinstein
| party1 = Democratic Party (United States)
| popular_vote1 = 6,019,422
| percentage1 = 54.2%| image2 = 
| candidate2 = Kevin de León
| party2 = Democratic Party (United States)
| popular_vote2 = 5,093,942
| percentage2 = 45.8%
| map_image = 2018 United States Senate election in California results map by county.svg
| map_size = 250px
| map_caption = County resultsFeinstein:  de León:   
| title = U.S. Senator
| before_election = Dianne Feinstein
| before_party = Democratic Party (United States)
| after_election = Dianne Feinstein
| after_party = Democratic Party (United States)
}}

The 2018 United States Senate election in California' took place on November 6, 2018, to elect a member of the United States Senate to represent California, concurrently with other elections to the United States Senate, elections to the United States House of Representatives, and various state and local elections.

Under California's non-partisan blanket primary law, all candidates appear on the same ballot, regardless of party. In the primary, voters may vote for any candidate, regardless of their party affiliation. In the California system, the top two finishers — regardless of party — advance to the general election in November, even if a candidate receives a majority of the votes cast in the primary election. Washington and Louisiana have similar "jungle primary" style processes for U.S. Senate elections, as does Mississippi for U.S. Senate special elections.

The candidate filing deadline was March 8, 2018, and the primary election was held on June 5, 2018.

Four-term Democratic incumbent Dianne Feinstein won re-election in 2012 with 63% of the vote, taking the record for the most popular votes in any U.S. Senate election in history, with 7.86 million votes. Feinstein, at the time, was the ranking member of the Senate Judiciary Committee. She turned 85 years old in 2018, leading some to speculate that she would retire in January 2019, as her long-time colleague Barbara Boxer did in January 2017. However, Feinstein ran for reelection to her fifth full term, winning 44.2% of the vote in the top-two primary; she faced Democratic challenger Kevin de León in the general election, who won 12.1% of the primary vote. For the second time since direct elections to the Senate began after the passage of the Seventeenth Amendment in 1913, no Republican appeared on the general election ballot for U.S. Senate in California. The highest Republican finisher in the primary won only 8.3 percent of the vote, and the 10 Republicans only won 31.2 percent of the vote among them.

In the general election, Feinstein defeated de León by an eight-point margin, 54% to 46%. This was Feinstein's closest election since 1994.

Candidates
Democratic Party
Declared
 Kevin de León, President pro tempore of the California State Senate
 Adrienne Nicole Edwards, Vice Chairwoman on the HDT Community Development Foundation board
 Dianne Feinstein, incumbent U.S. Senator
 Pat Harris, attorney
 Alison Hartson, national director of Wolf PAC
 David Hildebrand, legislative analyst
 Herbert G. Peters, retired aerospace engineer and candidate for U.S Senate in California in 2016
 Douglas Howard Pierce
 Gerald Plummer
 Donnie O. Turner, Air Force veteran

Withdrawn
 Topher Brennan
 John Melendez, television writer and radio personality
 Steve Stokes, candidate for the U.S. Senate in 2016

Declined
 Ana Kasparian, co-host of The Young Turks Joe Sanberg, entrepreneur and investor
 Tom Steyer, hedge fund manager
 Cenk Uygur, host of The Young Turks''

Republican Party

Declared
 Arun K. Bhumitra, businessman
 James P. Bradley, businessman
 Jack Crew, bus driver
 Erin Cruz, published author
 Rocky De La Fuente, entrepreneur and perennial candidate
 Jerry Joseph Laws, candidate for the U.S. Senate in 2016
 Patrick Little, neo-Nazi and Holocaust denier
 Kevin Mottus, candidate for the U.S Senate in 2016
 Mario Nabliba, scientist
 Tom Palzer, activist, retired city planner and candidate for the U.S. Senate in 2016
 Paul Allen Taylor, businessman

Withdrawn

 Donald R. Adams, businessman
 Gary Coson
 John Estrada
 Timothy Charles Kalemkarian, perennial candidate
 Ernie Konnyu, former U.S. Representative
 Caren Lancona, businesswoman
 Jazmina Saavedra, businesswoman and activist
 Stephen James Schrader, veteran

Declined
 Kevin Faulconer, Mayor of San Diego
 Caitlyn Jenner, 1976 Olympic gold medalist and television personality
 Arnold Schwarzenegger, actor and former Governor of California
 Ashley Swearengin, former Mayor of Fresno

Libertarian Party

Declared
 Derrick Michael Reid, retired attorney and engineer and candidate for president in 2016

Green Party

Declared
 Michael V. Ziesing (write-in)

Peace and Freedom Party

Declared
 John Thompson Parker

No party preference

Declared
 Colleen Shea Fernald, perennial candidate
 Tim Gildersleeve, businessman and researcher
 Rash Bihari Ghosh
 Michael Fahmy Girgis
 Don J. Grundmann, California Constitution Party chairman and perennial candidate (Constitution Party)
 Jason M. Hanania
 David Moore (Socialist Equality Party)
 Lee W. Olson
 Ursula M. Schilling (write-in)
 Ling Ling Shi, evangelist

Withdrawn
 Jerry Leon Carroll
 Michael Eisen, biologist
 Charles Junior Hodge
 Richard Thomas Mead
 Clifton Roberts (Humane Party)

Notes

Primary election

Endorsements

Fundraising

Polling

with Timothy Charles Kalemkarian, Caren Lancona, John Melendez, and Stephen Schrader

with Tom Steyer

with John Cox

with Xavier Becerra, Kevin Faulconer, Brad Sherman, Eric Swalwell, and Ashley Swearingin

Results

Democratic candidates won a combined total of 4,231,444, Republican candidates 2,216,223 votes, and other candidates 223,053 votes.

General election

Debates
Complete video of debate, October 17, 2018

Endorsements

Fundraising

Predictions
Because of California's top-two runoff system, the seat was guaranteed to be won/held by a Democrat since the initial primary produced two Democratic candidates.

Polling

with Feinstein, de León, and Tom Steyer

with Feinstein, de León, and John Cox

Results 

The race had an undervote of around 1.3 million votes compared to the gubernatorial election, likely by Republican voters choosing neither candidate. De León won many of the same counties and congressional districts won by Republican gubernatorial nominee John Cox, as many voters may have expressed opposition to the incumbent senator. No county voted for both Feinstein and Cox. Congressional districts 39, 45, and 48 were the only congressional districts that voted for both Feinstein and Cox.

Results by county 
Results by county. Blue represents counties won by Feinstein. Cyan represents counties won by de León.

References

External links
Candidates at Vote Smart
Candidates at Ballotpedia
Campaign finance at FEC
Campaign finance at OpenSecrets

Official campaign websites
Dianne Feinstein (D) for Senate 
Kevin de León (D) for Senate

2018
California
United States Senate